Amazohoughia is a genus of flies in the family Tachinidae.

Species
Amazohoughia argentifrons Townsend, 1934
Amazohoughia flavipes Thompson, 1964

References

Exoristinae
Tachinidae genera
Diptera of North America
Diptera of South America
Taxa named by Charles Henry Tyler Townsend